Taswell is an unincorporated community in Patoka Township, Crawford County, Indiana, located on State Road 64 west of the county seat of English.

History
A post office was established at Taswell in 1882, and remained in operation until it was discontinued in 1996. It was intended that the community be named for the Laswell family of settlers, but when the postal authorities misspelled the name Taswell, the new name stuck.

Geography

References

External links

Unincorporated communities in Crawford County, Indiana
Unincorporated communities in Indiana
1882 establishments in Indiana
Populated places established in 1882